Stillmore is a city in Emanuel County, Georgia, United States. The population was 532 at the 2010 census, down from 730 in 2000.

Geography

Stillmore is located in southeastern Emanuel County at  (32.441176, -82.214637). Georgia State Route 57 passes through the town, leading northwest  to Swainsboro, the county seat, and southeast  to Interstate 16 at Exit 98. Georgia State Route 192 crosses GA 57 in the center of Stillmore, leading northeast  to Twin City and west  to U.S. Route 1.

Demographics

As of the census of 2000, there were 730 people, 220 households, and 159 families residing in the town. The racial makeup of the town was 35.07% White, 47.95% African American, 0.14% Native American, 1.23% Asian, 15.07% from other races, and 0.55% from two or more races. Hispanic or Latino of any race were 17.81% of the population.

There were 220 households, out of which 36.8% had children under the age of 18 living with them, 50.0% were married couples living together, 17.3% had a female householder with no husband present, and 27.3% were non-families. 20.5% of all households were made up of individuals, and 10.9% had someone living alone who was 65 years of age or older.  The average household size was 3.32 and the average family size was 3.39.

In the town the population was spread out, with 26.8% under the age of 18, 17.3% from 18 to 24, 27.7% from 25 to 44, 18.1% from 45 to 64, and 10.1% who were 65 years of age or older.  The median age was 28 years. For every 100 females, there were 125.3 males.  For every 100 females age 18 and over, there were 128.2 males.

The median income for a household in the town was $26,827, and the median income for a family was $28,625. Males had a median income of $26,442 versus $15,250 for females. The per capita income for the town was $9,623.  About 25.2% of families and 34.4% of the population were below the poverty line, including 22.2% of those under age 18 and 34.9% of those age 65 or over.

History 
An early variant name was "Kea's Mill". According to tradition, the town's present name stems from the offer by postal officials to supply "still more" names if their list of suitable names for the post office was not satisfactory.

Education
Stillmore is home to the David Emanuel Academy (DEA), a Christian school. Local public school students are zoned to attend Emanuel County School District schools, including Swainsboro High School.

Notable residents
 George L. Smith, former Speaker of the Georgia House of Representatives

In the media
The town is the setting for Stillmore, Georgia, a play written, produced, and directed by Brad Ogden.

References

Cities in Emanuel County, Georgia
Cities in Georgia (U.S. state)